Methia jamaicensis is a species of beetle in the family Cerambycidae. It was described by Philips and Ivie in 1998.

References

Methiini
Beetles described in 1998